The Summit Communications Group is an Atlanta-based communications company which once owned 16 radio stations around the United States. The company now concentrates on technology and internet services.

Defunct radio broadcasting companies of the United States